The Depths may refer to:
 The Lower Depths, a play by Maxim Gorky
 Na Dne, former name of Put Domoi, a Russian street newspaper 
 The Depths: The Evolutionary Origins of the Depression Epidemic, a 2014 book by Jonathan Rottenberg
 The Depths (2011 film), a 2011 Japanese/South Korean film directed by Ryusuke Hamaguchi
 The Depths (2019 film), a 2019 Canadian film directed by Ariane Louis-Seize.